Church Street is one of the main thoroughfares of Warrington in Cheshire, England, linking the modern town centre to St Elphin's Church, to the east.

History
Church Street formed the nucleus of the mediaeval town, and was the location of fairs and markets. Oliver Cromwell lodged in this area during the English Civil War.

Conservation area

A Conservation area based around Church Street was designated in 1983.

Notes

Geography of Warrington